Chlorphenoxamine (Phenoxene) is an antihistamine and anticholinergic used as an antipruritic and antiparkinsonian agent. It is an analog of diphenhydramine.

References 

H1 receptor antagonists
Chlorobenzenes
Ethers
Dimethylamino compounds